This is a list of lighthouses in Djibouti.

See also
List of lighthouses in Eritrea (to the north)
List of lighthouses in Somalia (to the south-east)
 Lists of lighthouses and lightvessels

References

External links

Djibouti
Lighthouses
Lighthouses
Lighthouses in Djibouti